The inauguration of Hassan Rouhani as the 7th President of Iran took place on two rounds, first on Saturday 3 August 2013 whereby he received his presidential precept from Supreme Leader Ali Khamenei and entered to the Sa'dabad Palace, official residence of the president in a private ceremony. The second was on the next day with sworn in for the office in the Parliament of Iran. This marked the commencement of the four-year term of Hassan Rouhani as president and his vice president. The event was awaited with some expectation, since for the first time foreign guests participated in the ceremony. The oath of office was administered by Chief Justice, Sadeq Larijani.

Planning
The inauguration ceremony began at 16:00 IRDT and finished at 19:00. Foreign guests resided in two places. Heads of states and governments stayed at the Sa'dabad Palace, which is the official residence of the Iranian president. Other guests based in Parsian Esteghlal Hotel. Hassan Rouhani went to Imam Khomeini Hosseinieh, the official residence of Supreme Leader of Iran to receive his presidential precept from Mahmoud Ahmadinejad. After that, he began his career as President of Iran officially. On the next day, an official inauguration took place which he must perform the oath of office beside Sadeq Larijani, head of Judiciary System of Iran. Before the sworn in ceremony begins, Parliament speaker, Ali Larijani welcomed the new government and guests with a 30-minute speech. Rouhani had a 45-minute mandate for his first speech as the President of Iran.

Invitations
The group organizing the inauguration invited international and national authorities for the swearing in ceremony. The ceremonial body of the Parliament sent invitations to all members of the current legislature and some famous Iranian political and cultural persons. All governors of the provinces, ambassadors and Friday prayer imams were invited for the event. Former presidents, including Mahmoud Ahmadinejad, Mohammad Khatami and Akbar Hashemi Rafsanjani, were also invited. After the ceremony, guests attended a dinner party hosted by Rouhani.

Foreign dignitaries
The following leaders attended the swearing in ceremony:

After the election of Rouhani as the seventh president of Iran, former Secretary of State for Foreign and Commonwealth Affairs Jack Straw, who has a close friendship with Hassan Rouhani, publicly announced his inclination for participating in Rouhani's presidential inauguration. Two weeks later, Parliament sent an official invitation to him. However, he declined this invitation due to personal and family reasons and also that he was not a British official. Abbas Araghchi, the spokesperson of Ministry of Foreign Affairs also announced that Parliament sent invitations to all governments' officials except Israel, with which Iran has no formal relations.

Sudanese President Omar al-Bashir had confirmed his participation in the ceremony but his chartered Saudi aircraft was prevented from flying into Saudi Arabian airspace on its way to Tehran.

Broadcast
Rouhani's inauguration was broadcast nationally by all major television networks. IRIB broadcast the event live. BBC Persian, Voice of America, Press TV, Manoto, CNN, ABC News, NBC, Channel 4, RT, NRK, SRF, Euronews, TRT Türk and Al Jazeera also aired the event. Among 2,000 reporters were permitted to enter the Parliament house.

See also
Second Inauguration of Hassan Rouhani

References

2013 in Iran
2013 in politics
2013 Iranian presidential election
Rouhani
Presidency of Hassan Rouhani
Ceremonies in Iran
August 2013 events in Iran